Matt Carter (born May 13, 1981) is an American stock car racing driver and the son of former NASCAR Sprint Cup Series car owner Travis Carter.

Early career
Before moving on to ARCA and NASCAR, Carter ran in the USAR Hooters Pro Cup Series, where he was named Rookie of the Year in 2004. He scored one win in the series, coming at Iowa Speedway in September 2007.

ARCA
Carter made his debut in the series in 2008. He replaced Frank Kimmel in the No. 46 Stine Seed Ford for Larry Clement and made a run for the championship. He won his first career race at Toledo Speedway after starting 13th. Carted ended the year 3rd in points, earning one win and fourteen top 10s. He also earned Rookie of the Year honors. In 2009, Carter only ran his two races as the No. 46 team cut back its schedule. His best finish was 16th at Iowa Speedway.

NASCAR
Carter's only career Camping World Truck Series start came in 2003 at Martinsville Speedway. Driving the No. 96 HeavyTruckDealers.com Dodge for Carl Long, he finished 17th after starting 14th.

Carter made his then-NASCAR Busch Series debut in 2007 at Memphis Motorsports Park. Driving the No. 40 Dodge for Specialty Racing, he started 31st and finished 39th after a crash midway through the race.

He returned to the Nationwide Series and the team in 2009, replacing Brandon Whitt in the No. 61 Ford at New Hampshire. In 15 starts, Carter earned three top 20 finishes, including a career-best of 12th at Bristol Motor Speedway. After the Dollar General 300, he left the team, citing increased frustration with the direction of the team. He was replaced by Kenny Hendrick and Jason Bowles. Carter returned to the Nationwide Series in 2011, driving primarily for start and park operation Fleur-de-lis Motorsports.

Carter made his first start of the 2012 season in the Nationwide Series at Dover International Speedway in June for Rick Ware Racing.

In 2014, Carter joined JGL Racing.

Motorsports career results

NASCAR
(key) (Bold – Pole position awarded by qualifying time. Italics – Pole position earned by points standings or practice time. * – Most laps led.)

Nationwide Series

Craftsman Truck Series

ARCA Re/Max Series
(key) (Bold – Pole position awarded by qualifying time. Italics – Pole position earned by points standings or practice time. * – Most laps led.)

References

External links
 

Living people
1981 births
People from Denver, North Carolina
Racing drivers from North Carolina
NASCAR drivers
ARCA Menards Series drivers
CARS Tour drivers